Maialen García Galarraga (born 5 April 1990) is a Spanish field hockey player for the Spanish national team.

She participated at the 2018 Women's Hockey World Cup.

References

1990 births
Living people
Spanish female field hockey players
Sportspeople from San Sebastián
Field hockey players from the Basque Country (autonomous community)